Spig may refer to:

 Spigelia, a plant used extensively in homeopathy
 Frank Wead (1895–1947), nicknamed "Spig", a U.S. Navy aviator
 SPIG Industry LLC, a Virginia-based company founded by Joshua Harman

See also
 SplG, an alternate name for spore photoproduct lyase
 SIPG — Shanghai International Port Group